David Leadbetter (19 November 1934 – 15 March 2006), was a figure in Scottish politics.

He was born in South Battersea, London, England.

References

1934 births
2006 deaths
People from Battersea
Scottish communists
Alumni of Newcastle University
Alumni of the University of Stirling
International Marxist Group members